The 2020–21 Ligue Inter Régions is the 58th season of the Algerian Third Division since its establishment, And the first in the new system of six groups West, Centre West, Centre East, East, South West and South East, each group with 8 clubs.

League table

Group West

Groupe West 1

Groupe West 2

Group Center West

Groupe Centre West 1

Groupe Centre West 2

Group Centre East

Groupe Centre East 1

Groupe Centre East 2

Group East

Groupe East 1

Groupe East 2

Group South West

Groupe South West 1

Groupe South West 2

Group South East

Groupe South East 1

Groupe South East 2

Promotion play-offs
All times are UTC (UTC+1).

Matches

References

External links
 Ligue Nationale de Football Amateur
 Algerian Football Federation

Ligue Nationale du Football Amateur seasons
3
Algeria